The  2015 United States Open Championship was the 115th U.S. Open, played June 18–21, 2015 at Chambers Bay in University Place, Washington, southwest of Tacoma on the shore of Puget Sound. Jordan Spieth won his first U.S. Open and consecutive major titles, one stroke ahead of runners-up Dustin Johnson and Louis Oosthuizen. This was the first U.S. Open televised by Fox Sports 1 and Fox Sports, launching a 12-year contract with the United States Golf Association.

Spieth, age 21, became the youngest U.S. Open champion in 92 years, since Bobby Jones in 1923. The reigning Masters champion, Spieth became the youngest to win the Masters and U.S. Open in the same year, passing Tiger Woods, who won both in 2002 at age 26. Others to win the first two majors of the year were Craig Wood (1941), Ben Hogan (1951, 1953), Arnold Palmer (1960), and Jack Nicklaus (1972).

This was the first U.S. Open played in the Pacific Northwest and the third major played in the state of Washington, which hosted the PGA Championship in 1944 and 1998.

Venue
Owned by Pierce County, the Chambers Bay course opened for play only eight years earlier in June 2007.

Course layout

Holes 1 and 18 were played as either par-4 or par-5: the first was a par-4 and the 18th was a par-5 for three of the rounds, switching only for the second round on Friday, and the course was par 70 for each round.

^ In Round 2 on Friday, Hole #1 was played as a par 5 and #18 as a par 4; par was 36 out and 34 in.
Source:

Criticism of the course
Chambers Bay was subject to criticism for its bumpy greens, unfair course design, and poor accessibility for spectators. Former U.S. Open champion Gary Player called it "the worst golf course I might've ever seen in the 63 years as a professional golfer", and Henrik Stenson said that the greens were like "putting on broccoli".

Field
About half the field consisted of players who are exempt from qualifying for the U.S. Open. Each player is classified according to the first category in which he qualified, and other categories are shown in parentheses.

1. Winners of the U.S. Open Championship during the last ten years
Ángel Cabrera, Lucas Glover, Martin Kaymer (7,8,11,12,13,14), Graeme McDowell (13,14), Rory McIlroy (6,7,12,13,14), Geoff Ogilvy (12), Justin Rose (12,13,14), Webb Simpson (12,13,14), Tiger Woods (8)
Prior to the tournament, Michael Campbell, the 2005 winner, announced his retirement from golf.

2. Winner and runner-up of the 2014 U.S. Amateur Championship
Gunn Yang (a)
Corey Conners forfeited his exemption by turning professional.

3. Winner of the 2014 Amateur Championship
Bradley Neil (a)

4. Winner of the 2014 Mark H. McCormack Medal (men's World Amateur Golf Ranking)
Ollie Schniederjans (a)

5. Winners of the Masters Tournament during the last five years
Charl Schwartzel (13,14), Adam Scott (11,12,13,14), Jordan Spieth (12,13,14), Bubba Watson (12,13,14)

6. Winners of The Open Championship during the last five years
Darren Clarke, Ernie Els, Phil Mickelson (13,14), Louis Oosthuizen (13,14)

7. Winners of the PGA Championship during the last five years
Keegan Bradley (11,13,14), Jason Dufner

8. Winners of The Players Championship during the last three years
Rickie Fowler (11,12,13,14)

9. Winner of the 2015 European Tour BMW PGA Championship
An Byeong-hun (13,14)

10. Winner of the 2014 U.S. Senior Open Championship
Colin Montgomerie

11. The 10 lowest scorers and anyone tying for 10th place at the 2014 U.S. Open Championship
Erik Compton, Jason Day (12,13,14), Dustin Johnson (12,13,14), Brooks Koepka (13,14), Brandt Snedeker (13,14), Henrik Stenson (13,14), Jimmy Walker (12,13,14)

12. Players who qualified for the season-ending 2014 Tour Championship
Jim Furyk (13,14), Sergio García (13,14), Bill Haas (13,14), Russell Henley (13,14), Morgan Hoffmann, Billy Horschel (13,14), Zach Johnson (13,14), Chris Kirk (13,14), Matt Kuchar (13,14), Hunter Mahan (13,14), Hideki Matsuyama (13,14), Kevin Na (13,14), Ryan Palmer (13,14), Patrick Reed (13,14), John Senden (13,14), Brendon Todd (13,14), Cameron Tringale, Gary Woodland (13,14)

13. The top 60 point leaders and ties as of May 25, 2015 in the Official World Golf Ranking
Paul Casey (14), George Coetzee, Jamie Donaldson (14), Victor Dubuisson (14), Matt Every (14), Tommy Fleetwood (14), Stephen Gallacher (14), Branden Grace (14), Charley Hoffman (14), J. B. Holmes (14), Thongchai Jaidee (14), Miguel Ángel Jiménez (14), Anirban Lahiri (14), Marc Leishman (14), Shane Lowry (14), Joost Luiten (14), Ben Martin (14), Francesco Molinari (14), Ryan Moore (14), Ian Poulter (14), Marc Warren, Lee Westwood (14), Bernd Wiesberger (14), Danny Willett (14)

14. The top 60 point leaders and ties as of June 15, 2015 in the Official World Golf Ranking
Kevin Kisner, Andy Sullivan

15. Special exemptions given by the USGA
None

The remaining contestants earned their places through sectional qualifiers.
Japan: Baek Seuk-hyun, Kurt Barnes, Hiroyuki Fujita, Masahiro Kawamura, Liang Wenchong
England: Thomas Aiken, Lucas Bjerregaard, Marcus Fraser, Shiv Kapur, Alexander Lévy, Garth Mulroy, Alex Norén, Jason Palmer, John Parry, Marcel Siem, Tjaart van der Walt
United States
Newport Beach, California: Jared Becher (L), Brian Campbell (a), Beau Hossler (a), Alex Kim (L), Jake Knapp (a,L), Kevin Lucas (L)
Jupiter, Florida: Luke Donald, Sam Horsfield (a), Jack Maguire (a), Andy Pope (L)
Ball Ground, Georgia: Roberto Castro, Lee McCoy (a), Matthew NeSmith (a,L)
Rockville, Maryland: Billy Hurley III, Denny McCarthy (a), Timothy O'Neal (L)
Purchase, New York: Rich Berberian Jr. (L), Lee Janzen, Jamie Lovemark, Pat Wilson (L)
Columbus, Ohio: Sebastian Cappelen, Bryson DeChambeau (a), Brad Fritsch, David Hearn, Ryo Ishikawa, Danny Lee, George McNeill, D. A. Points, Michael Putnam, Sam Saunders, Cameron Smith, Robert Streb, Daniel Summerhays, Bo Van Pelt, Camilo Villegas
Springfield, Ohio: Michael Davan (L), Tony Finau, Nick Hardy (a,L), Stephan Jäger (L)
Memphis, Tennessee: Blayne Barber, Charlie Beljan, Tyler Duncan (L), Brad Elder (L), Retief Goosen, Brandon Hagy (L), Brian Harman, Tom Hoge (L), Davis Riley (a), Andrés Romero
Dallas, Texas: Jason Allred, Cody Gribble, Cole Hammer (a,L), Kyle Jones (a), Matt Mabrey (L), Mark Silvers (L)
Cle Elum, Washington: Troy Kelly, Richard H. Lee, Pan Cheng-tsung (L)

Alternates who gained entry:
Oliver Farr (England)
Shunsuke Sonoda (Japan)
Kevin Chappell (Columbus) – claimed spot held for category 14
Jimmy Gunn (L, Memphis) – claimed spot held for category 14
Steve Marino (Dallas) – claimed spot held for category 14
Josh Persons (L, Rockville) – claimed spot held for category 14

(a) denotes amateur
(L) denotes player advanced through local qualifying

Source:

Past champions in the field

Made the cut

Missed the cut 

Michael Campbell (2005) did not enter

Nationalities in the field

Round summaries

First round
Thursday, June 18, 2015

Dustin Johnson and Henrik Stenson both posted rounds of 65 (−5) to share the lead after the first round. Johnson recorded four birdies on his back-nine and did not make a bogey until the par-3 9th, his 18th hole of the round. Stenson, meanwhile, birdied four of his last five holes to tie Johnson for the lead. Jordan Spieth, the reigning Masters champion, was three strokes back after a 68. Three-time champion Tiger Woods opened with a round of 80 (+10), his worst score ever at the U.S. Open. Brian Campbell, a senior at the University of Illinois, was low amateur after a round of 67 (−3), two behind the lead.

The scoring average for the field was 72.72 (+2.72) and 25 players had under-par rounds.

Second round
Friday, June 19, 2015

Masters champion Jordan Spieth shot a round of 67 (−3) to tie Patrick Reed for the 36-hole lead. First round co-leader Dustin Johnson got as low as 7-under before bogeys on three of his last five holes dropped him to a stroke behind the leaders. Jason Day was just two shots off the lead playing the 9th hole, his 18th of the round, when he collapsed from vertigo. After being treated by medical personnel for several minutes, Day was able to finish the hole and made bogey, dropping to three behind and a tie for 9th place. Tiger Woods missed the cut with a two-round score of 16-over-par, his worst 36-hole score in a major.

A bogey on the final hole by Nick Hardy, a freshman from the University of Illinois, moved the cut line to +5. Fifteen additional players earned entry into the third round, including Ángel Cabrera, Sergio García, Colin Montgomerie, Webb Simpson, and Jimmy Walker.	

The 1st hole was set as a 593-yard par-5 and the 18th hole as 514-yard par-4, with the total yardage at 7,695. The scoring average for the field was 73.48 (+3.48) and 18 players had under-par rounds. J. B. Holmes and Louis Oosthuizen had the low rounds of the day, 66 (−4).

Amateurs: Campbell (−1), Maguire (+1), Schniederjans (+2), Hossler (+3), McCarthy (+4), Hardy (+5),McCoy (+8), DeChambeau (+9), Neil (+9), NeSmith (+9), Jones (+10), Knapp (+10), Yang (+10), Horsfield (+11), Riley (+13), Hammer (+21)

Third round
Saturday, June 20, 2015

Louis Oosthuizen again had the low round of the day, 66 (−4), moving him into a tie for 5th place. Despite suffering from vertigo, Jason Day scored 68 (−2), the second lowest round of the day.	

The 1st hole was set as a 499-yard par-4 and the 18th hole as 577-yard par-5, with the total yardage at 7,637. The scoring average for the field was 73.13 (+3.13) and only 6 players had under-par rounds.

Final round
Sunday, June 21, 2015

Four players began the final round tied for the lead for the first time at the U.S. Open since 1973. In the final pairing with Jason Day at 3 pm PDT, Dustin Johnson recorded two birdies on the front nine to take sole possession of the lead, then lost it with bogeys on three out of four holes to begin the back nine. In the penultimate pairing, Jordan Spieth and Branden Grace both birdied the par-4 12th to tie, but Grace fell from contention on the 16th after his drive went out of bounds and he made double bogey. Spieth holed a  birdie putt at the 16th to open up a three-stroke lead, but then three-putted for double bogey on the par-3 17th to fall into a tie with Louis Oosthuizen. Oosthuizen began the round three shots off the lead and quickly dropped further behind with three consecutive bogeys on the front-nine. Beginning at the 12th, however, Oosthuizen birdied six out of his last seven holes to tie Spieth. At the par-5 18th, Spieth hit the green in two and proceeded to two-putt for birdie. Johnson recovered from his bogey streak with a birdie at the 17th, then also found the 18th green in two. Faced with a  eagle putt to win the championship, Johnson's attempt rolled three feet (0.9 m) past the hole, then missed his birdie putt to tie. Expecting a Monday playoff, Spieth suddenly gained a one-stroke victory for his second consecutive major title.

With the win, Spieth became the sixth to win both the Masters and U.S. Open in the same year and the first since Tiger Woods in 2002. He also became the first to win two majors before the age of 22 since Gene Sarazen in 1922, and the youngest U.S. Open champion since Bobby Jones in 1923. After opening with a round of 77 (+7), Oosthuizen shot 199 over his last three rounds, tying the U.S. Open record for lowest 54-hole score. His score of 29 on the back-nine also tied a tournament record.

The scoring average for the field was 71.29 (+1.29) and 22 players had under-par rounds. Adam Scott had the low round of the championship, a 6-under-par 64 to tie for fourth.

Final leaderboard

Scorecard

Cumulative tournament scores, relative to par

Source:

Media
This was the first U.S. Open televised by Fox Sports, which began a 12-year contract to televise the championship and other USGA events. The previous 20 years (1995–2014) had been by NBC Sports, preceded by 29 years (1966–1994) on ABC Sports.

References

External links

United States Golf Association
Coverage on the PGA Tour's official site
Coverage on the European Tour's official site
Coverage on the PGA of America's official site

U.S. Open (golf)
Golf in Washington (state)
Sports competitions in Washington (state)
U.S. Open
U.S. Open (golf)
U.S. Open (golf)
U.S. Open (golf)